van Noppen is a surname. Notable people with the surname include:

Flor Van Noppen (born 1956), Belgian politician
Joëlle van Noppen (1980–2010), Dutch singer

Surnames of Dutch origin